Lesieur is a last name, and may refer to:

 Art Lesieur (1907–1967), American ice hockey player
 Émile Lesieur (1885–1985), French rugby player
 Eugène Lesieur (1890–1975), French wrestler
 Jean-Pierre Lesieur (born 1935), French poet
 Georges Lesieur (1848–1931), French businessman 
 Marie Lesieur (1799–1890), known as Marie Lesueur, French ballet dancer
 Stephen Lesieur, Swiss-born English diplomat

Surnames of French origin